Roque Bluffs State Park is a public recreation area on the coast of the Atlantic Ocean in the town of Roque Bluffs, Washington County, Maine. The  state park overlooks Englishman Bay from Schoppee Point and  includes  Simpson Pond and six miles of walking trails. Visitors can inspect glacial striations attesting to the Ice Age history of the Maine coast. The park is managed by the Maine Department of Agriculture, Conservation and Forestry.

In the news
In 2011, Maine police, wardens, marine patrol officers and members of the U.S. Coast Guard conducted a fruitless five-day search for a resident of Fredericton, New Brunswick, Torray Wallace, one of many people who appeared in the 2005 film "BBS: The Documentary", after his vehicle was found abandoned in the park.

In 2013, two women, one from nearby Machias and the other visiting from Pennsylvania, drowned after driving off a boat ramp in the park during high tide and inclement weather. The women had been rescued earlier in the day after getting lost while hiking in the fog.

References

External links
Roque Bluffs State Park Department of Agriculture, Conservation and Forestry
Roque Bluffs State Park Guide & Map Department of Agriculture, Conservation and Forestry

State parks of Maine
Protected areas of Washington County, Maine
Beaches of Maine
Landforms of Washington County, Maine
Protected areas established in 1969
1969 establishments in Maine